The National Film Preservation Act is the name of several federal laws relating to the identification, acquisition, storage, and dissemination of "films that are culturally, historically, or aesthetically significant."

Legislative history

1988
The original National Film Preservation Act of 1988 (Public Law 100-446) was part of an appropriations bill for the United States Department of the Interior.  The law specified three tasks:

 Directs the Librarian of Congress to establish a National Film Registry to register films that are culturally, historically, or aesthetically significant.
 Prohibits any person from knowingly distributing or exhibiting to the public a film that has been materially altered, or a black and white film that has been colorized and is included in the Registry, unless such films are labeled disclosing specified information.
 Directs the Librarian to establish in the Library of Congress a National Film Preservation Board."

1992
The National Film Preservation Act of 1992 reauthorized the National Film Preservation Board (NFPB) for four years (Public Law 102-307) and added the requirement for the Librarian of Congress to "study and report to the Congress on the current state of film preservation and restoration activities, including the activities of the Library of Congress and other major film archives in the United States; and (2) establish a comprehensive national film preservation program for motion pictures, in conjunction with other film archivists and copyright owners."

1996
The National Film Preservation Act of 1996 reauthorized the NFPB for an additional seven years (Public Law 104-285), and also created the National Film Preservation Foundation (NFPF) as a charitable organization, although the NFPF is not a government agency.

2005
The National Film Preservation Act of 2005 reauthorized both the NFPB and the NFPF (Public Law 109-009) for an additional four years.

2008 
Library of Congress Sound Recording and Film Preservation Programs Reauthorization Act of 2008 reauthorized both the NFPB and the NFPF (Public Law 110-336) until fiscal year 2016.

2016 
The Library of Congress Sound Recording and Film Preservation Programs Reauthorization Act of 2016 reauthorized both the NFPB and the NFPF (Public Law 114-217) until fiscal year 2026.

Notes

External links

 National Film Preservation Board home page
 National Film Preservation Foundation home page

Film preservation
1988 in law
United States federal legislation
Library of Congress